Allahabad division, officially known as Prayagraj division, is an administrative unit of Indian state of Uttar Pradesh.

In 2000, when Uttar Pradesh was reorganised by forming Uttaranchal out of its northern areas, Allahabad division and the district was majorly reorganised too.  The Etawah, Farrukhabad and Kanpur district districts of the Allahabad division were made into a separate Kanpur division.  Parts of the western areas of Allahabad district were carved out to create a new district named Kaushambi.   At the same time, Pratapgarh district, that falls in Awadh, was included in the Allahabad division.

Since 2000 Allahabad division consists of the following districts:
 Allahabad district (officially known as Prayagraj district since October 2018)
 Fatehpur district
 Kaushambi district
 Pratapgarh district

Prior to 2000 Allahabad division consisted of all the districts of the lower Doab:
 Allahabad district
 Etawah district
 Farrukhabad district
 Fatehpur district
 Kanpur district

Languages

See also
Districts of Uttar Pradesh

References

 
Divisions of Uttar Pradesh